Türje (Tyürje or Türgye)  was the name of a gens (Latin for "clan"; nemzetség in Hungarian) in the Kingdom of Hungary. The Szentgróti (Szentgiróti), Orbonay and Zalabéry families belong to this genus.

The village of Türje was first mentioned in 1234. The monastery of the premontre monks was founded at the beginning of the 13th century. In this time, the namesake kindred was the landowner of the village and the neighboring villages, including Zalaszentgrót too.

Notable members
Joachim, ispán (comes) of Szeben County (1210), ancestor of the Szentgróti family
Gecse, ispán of Zala (1225) and Bars Counties (1236–1240)
Denis (d. 1255), voivode of Transylvania (1233–1234), ban of Slavonia (1241–1244/5), palatine (1245–1246; 1248)
Philip (d. 1272), bishop of Zagreb (1248–1262), chancellor (1262–1270; 1272), archbishop of Esztergom (1262–1272), first perpetual ispán of Esztergom County (1270–1272)

References

Sources 
 János Karácsonyi: A magyar nemzetségek a XIV. század közepéig. Budapest: Magyar Tudományos Akadémia. 1900–1901.